The 1802 United States elections occurred in the middle of Democratic-Republican President Thomas Jefferson's first term, during the First Party System. Members of the 8th United States Congress were chosen in this election. Democratic-Republicans picked up several seats in both chambers of Congress, solidifying their control over the House and Senate.

In the House, 36 seats were added following the 1800 census. Democratic-Republicans gained many seats, increasing their majority.

In the Senate, Democratic-Republicans won major gains, increasing their previously-narrow majority.

See also
1802–03 United States House of Representatives elections
1802–03 United States Senate elections

References

1802 elections in the United States
1802
United States midterm elections